Harriot F. Curtis (born 1813) was an American writer and journalist.

Early life 
Harriot F. Curtis was born on September 16, 1813. Her family grew up in Kellyvale, Vermont (renamed Lowell, Vermont). Harriot Curtis moved to Lowell, Massachusetts against her parents' wishes. She began working at the Lawrence Manufacturing Company's payroll as a harness knitter in 1837.

The Lowell Offering 
The Lowell Offering was a newspaper that ran from 1840 to 1845, by Abel C. Thomas. After two years, Thomas left The Lowell Offering and it landed in the hands of Harriet Farley and Harriot F. Curtis. Harriott was a writer and editor for this newspaper, the first one entirely run by women. Benita Eisler wrote an anthology on this paper trying to raise awareness of the work environment. Harriott Curtis was known for her writing of books such as Kate in Search Of a Husband, Jessie's Flirtations,  and S.S.S. Philosophy. She also wrote for newspapers such as “the Home Journal, the New York Tribune, the Lowell Journal, and the American of Lowell”. Unfortunately, the editor still did not believe women were fit due to the hard labor work they face twelve hours a day. To excuse the demerits of the magazine, “the fact should be remembered that they are actively employed in the mills for more than twelve hours a day...a day of constant manual labor...must in some measure unfit the individual for full mental development” (Robinson, Hanson, 198). This further exemplifies the belief that women are unfit and under qualified, due to the fact they are forcefully placed in these mills or have to work in them as a last chance to keep their families afloat. The editors use this to excuse the woman when there are mistakes when the writers in these industries, these women, are holding up this company. Much like the common thought of how women are unfit to be paid and therefore they just are because it's up to the men who run these companies and hire the workers. They want to save money so they hire workers who seem like they don't deserve or are unfit in some way to make money due to the fact that they are women. With most of the Mill Workers being school girls, the paper represented and “portrayed the New England Girl”. The law required them to be school girls or country girls in order for them to be writers in the paper, and a majority were already employed and working in the Mills, day by day.

The Lowell Weekly 
Harriott F. Curtis began working as an editor in 1854 for the Lowell Weekly. The workers were respected here, you could not say that as of Lowell Offering. For a woman with little money and status who was a part of the Lowell mills in the 1830s, becoming an editor, journalist, and author was an incredible success. She used her writing to express the inequality between men and women in 19th-century society, especially as the industrial revolution swept across the globe.

Family 
Curtis' sister Betsey lived in Needham, Massachusetts. She moved in here after their mother's death. She never married and much of her writing “is striking for its critique of courtship and marriage, specifically the marriage market's oppressive effect upon young women”. It is learned that she does have a partner Hezekiah Morse Wead who has tried to propose to her multiple times and never succeeded to.

Influencers 
Nineteenth-century women who were writers such as Lydia Maria Child, Catharine Maria Sedgwick, Sarah Grimke, and other Lowell offering contributors, influenced Harriott Curtis. Being aware of other women's work and having influences in the writing field sparked a writing revolution for feminists at the time, and for years to come. Harriott Curtis showed others that social and economic class doesn't have an influence on the skill set a writer possesses. Curtis also gave lower-class workers a voice within her work, due to the experiences she had growing up within the Mills.

Harriet Hanson Robinson 
Another 19th-century writer who was close to Harriet Curtis is Harriet Hanson Robinson. In her memoir, Loom & Spindle (1898), “Harriet H. Robinson writes: I first knew Miss Curtis in about 1844, when she and Miss Farley lived in what was then Dracut...The house was a sort of literary center to those who had become interested in the Lowell Offering and it's writers...many who came...near and far...meet the 'girls'.

Selected works
 Kate in Search Of a Husband
 Jessie's Flirtations
 S.S.S. Philosophy

References 

1813 births
19th-century American journalists
19th-century American women writers
American women journalists
Year of death missing
People from Lowell, Vermont
Writers from Vermont
Journalists from Vermont